Flower of Disease is an album by American doom metal band Goatsnake, released in 2000. The LP version was released by Southern Lord Records.

Critical reception
AllMusic called the album "an enjoyable listen", writing that it "is a perfect marriage of modern production techniques, excellent riffing, melodic classic doom, and grooving ambience." LA Weekly wrote that "there's a certain slickness here, but an inimitable weirdness too, the combination of which makes this band so distinctly, quintessentially Los Angeles." The Encyclopedia of Popular Music wrote that the album "extended Goatsnake's move towards southern-fried doom leanings, further refining their bludgeoning style."

Track listing

Personnel
Goatsnake
Pete Stahl – vocals, harmonica
Greg Anderson – guitar
G. Stuart Dahlquist – bass
Greg Rogers – drums

Additional personnel
Dave Catching – lap steel on "El Coyote"

References

2000 albums
Goatsnake albums
Man's Ruin Records albums
Southern Lord Records albums
Rise Above Records albums
Albums produced by Nick Raskulinecz